Lü Zhi (born 1965) is a Chinese conservation biologist, panda expert and an expert on biodiversity. She is a professor at Peking University and also the executive director of the Peking University Center for Nature and Society. Lü is also the founder of the Shanshui Conservation Center which is dedicated to preserving the Three Rivers Headwater Region in Yushu, Qinghai.

Biography 
Lü began studying at Peking University in 1981, when she was sixteen. By 1992, she had completed all of her undergraduate and post-doctorate work at the same university. Her work with giant pandas began when she was nineteen, when she became part of a long-term field study on the animals, their habitat and their genetic diversity. During her field work, she created bonds with some of the pandas, helped a sick panda eat again and also became one of the first people to go inside of a wild panda's den. She also taught herself the skill of wildlife-photography while in the field, and her pictures were featured in National Geographic in 1993 and 1995.

From 1995 to 2000, she worked as a program office for the World Wildlife Fund (WWF) China. At WWF, she developed programs and activities which focused on the giant panda and also on the Tibetan Autonomous Region. She also helped to open the WWF Tibet office and to raise the total annual budget for conservation focusing on the panda and Tibet. In 2002, she began to work at Conservation International (CI). Lü Zhi worked as the head of CI's China office.

Lü's conservation work focuses on several large endangered species, including the giant panda, snow leopard, Przewalski's gazelle and the Tibetan brown bear. Her non-governmental organization (NGO), the Shanshui Conservation Center was founded in 2007 in order to help develop "community-based, grassroots solutions to conservation in western China." She emphasizes the importance of community-managed nature reserves in the fight to protect species and habitats, saying that these types of models are of benefit to both animals and sustainable use of the land by people. Lü Zhi hopes to see a "new economic system that recognises and pays for the value of nature" and at Shan Shui, they model these kinds of economic systems for the larger Chinese government. In addition to research and developing community-based conservation efforts, she has also worked with the Chinese government and businesses in order to develop more environmentally-friendly legislation and practices.

Lü has written and co-authored several books about science. Her book, Giant Pandas in the Wild (2002), was called "a work of art" by Library Journal.

References

External links
Lü Zhi's page at Peking University
Shanshui Conservation Center

Chinese conservationists
1965 births
Chinese women biologists
Giant pandas
Living people
21st-century women scientists
Academic staff of Peking University
Peking University alumni